East Tāmaki is a suburb of Auckland, New Zealand. It is a largely industrial area adjacent to a rapidly growing population. Prior to the 1960s it was largely a dairy farming area. A landmark is Smales Mountain which in 2010 has the remains of an old Pa, a stone field garden, an early church, and farm homestead. A newer landmark is the Fo Guang Shan Temple which was the largest Buddhist temple in New Zealand when it opened in 2007.

History

Te Puke o Tara (literally; ‘The Hill of Tara’); known also for a time as Smales Mount.  Te Puke o Tara was the home of paramount chief Tara Te Irirangi of  Ngai Tai Iwi. One of East Tāmaki's prominent volcanic cones, and prior to European settlement in the area was the site of a scoria cone Pā.  Like most of Auckland, the East Tāmaki landscape is volcanic in origin and forms a part of what is known as the East Tāmaki volcanic field, with Te Puke o Tara and Mātanginui (Greenmount) having been the dominant cones of Ōtara. A third cone called Highbrook by pakeha (white/European) settlers and in Maori Te Puke Ariki nui or Te Maunga/mountain of the Great/paramount chief.Mātangi nui was also a Pā site, not too far from Puke I Āki Rangi (Point View) which connected the Mangemangeroa valley, and the areas surrounding all three cones were thought to represent the densest area of pre-European settlement in East Tāmaki, favoured  rich volcanic gardening soils and fresh water springs.

The area was historically known as 'Farnsworth'

Demographics

East Tāmaki had a population of 489 at the 2018 New Zealand census, an increase of 114 people (30.4%) since the 2013 census, and an increase of 180 people (58.3%) since the 2006 census. There were 177 households, comprising 285 males and 201 females, giving a sex ratio of 1.42 males per female, with 51 people (10.4%) aged under 15 years, 105 (21.5%) aged 15 to 29, 309 (63.2%) aged 30 to 64, and 27 (5.5%) aged 65 or older.

Ethnicities were 41.1% European/Pākehā, 6.1% Māori, 9.2% Pacific peoples, 45.4% Asian, and 4.3% other ethnicities. People may identify with more than one ethnicity.

The percentage of people born overseas was 52.1, compared with 27.1% nationally.

Although some people chose not to answer the census's question about religious affiliation, 38.7% had no religion, 37.4% were Christian, 0.6% had Māori religious beliefs, 9.8% were Hindu, 3.1% were Muslim, 3.7% were Buddhist and 3.1% had other religions.

Of those at least 15 years old, 93 (21.2%) people had a bachelor's or higher degree, and 39 (8.9%) people had no formal qualifications. 81 people (18.5%) earned over $70,000 compared to 17.2% nationally. The employment status of those at least 15 was that 294 (67.1%) people were employed full-time, 39 (8.9%) were part-time, and 18 (4.1%) were unemployed.

Governance
The area is under local governance of the Auckland Council, and is located to the south-east of the Auckland city centre.

Economy
East Tāmaki is the largest industrial precinct in Auckland, a manufacturing and distribution hub of 2,000 businesses contributing $3 billion for the New Zealand economy each year, $19 million in rates annually, and 30,000 jobs with projected jobs of 45,000 on completion of Highbrook Business Park. It is consistently one of Auckland’s highest performing industrial property areas, and has a higher growth rate than the regional average.

References

External links
Photographs of East Tāmaki held in Auckland Libraries' heritage collections.

Suburbs of Auckland
Populated places on the Tāmaki River
Ōtara-Papatoetoe Local Board Area
Howick Local Board Area